Lost & Found is a 2022 thriller film directed by Jorge Dorado from a screenplay by Natxo López which stars Álvaro Morte, China Suárez, and Verónica Echegui. It is a Spanish-Argentine-German co-production.

Plot 
The plot follows surly lost & found worker Mario (an antihero character) who, upon handling a lost suitcase with human remains inside, gets involved in a criminal investigation pertaining human trafficking and luxury prostitution.

Cast

Production 
Lost & Found is a Spain-Argentina-Germany co-production, by Tandem Films alongside Setembro Cine, Tormenta Films, La Maleta Perdida AIE, Pampa Films, In Post We Trust and Rexin Film. It also had the participation of RTVE, Prime Video, ZDF, and Telemadrid; and funding from ICAA, INCAA, the Madrid regional administration, Ibermedia, Ayuntamiento de Madrid, ICO, and Crea SGR. It was shot in between Madrid and the province of Jujuy.

Release 
Filmax nabbed international sales rights for the film. The film was selected for a 17 September 2022 pre-screening as the closing film of the 6th Santander Film Festival. Distributed by Filmax, it was theatrically released in Spain on 30 September 2022.

Reception 
Toni Vall of Cinemanía rated the film 3 out of 5 stars, considering that, featuring an interesting detective premise about human trafficking, it is "effective almost all the time, extraordinarily filmed", yet also "suffers at times from a certain precipitation" and a lack of plausibility.

Raquel Hernández Luján of HobbyConsolas rated the film 57 out of 100 points ("so-so") highlighting the beginning, the performance by Echegui and the cameo by Eguileor as the best things about the film, which stars to fall apart upon the exploration of the luxury prostitution network due to "its lack of congruence".

Manuel J. Lombardo of Diario de Sevilla rated the film 2 out of 5 stars, considering that it features one of those genre scripts in which there is "hardly anything authentic left to scratch" behind its "carcass of stereotypes, [common] themes and commonplaces".

See also 
 List of Spanish films of 2022

References 

Spanish thriller films
Argentine thriller films
German thriller films
2020s Spanish films
2020s Argentine films
2020s German films
Films shot in Madrid
Films shot in Argentina
2020s Spanish-language films
Films about prostitution
Films about human trafficking